British Chinese (also known as Chinese British or Chinese Britons) are people of Chineseparticularly Han Chineseancestry who reside in the United Kingdom, constituting the second-largest group of Overseas Chinese in Western Europe after France.

The United Kingdom has the oldest Chinese community in Western Europe. The first waves of immigrants came between 1842 (the end of the First Opium War) and the 1940s (the end of World War II), largely through treaty ports opened as concessions to the British for the Opium Wars, such as Canton, Tianjin and Shanghai. British Chinese communities began to form in British ports in Liverpool, London, Cardiff, and Glasgow. In the Liverpool area, by the end of World War II, an estimated 900 Eurasian children were born to Chinese fathers and white mothers.

Since the middle of the 20th century, many British Chinese have been descended from people of former British colonies, such as Hong Kong, Malaysia, and Singapore. This shifted in the late-1970s with new waves of Chinese migrants coming from Vietnam, mainland China, and Hong Kong.

British Chinese live in every major British city, most notably including Greater London, Manchester, Birmingham, Glasgow, Edinburgh, Liverpool, Newcastle upon Tyne and Sheffield. Compared with most other ethnic minorities in the UK, the Chinese are amongst the most geographically dispersed. They have a record of high academic achievement, and have the second highest household income among demographic groups in the UK, after British Indians.

The cities of London, Manchester, Liverpool, Newcastle upon Tyne and Birmingham are the five cities in the United Kingdom that have Chinatowns.  

According to the 2021 Census, the Chinese ethnic group in England and Wales numbered 445,646, or 0.7% of the population.

Terminology
The term "Asian" in the United Kingdom usually refers to those of South Asian heritage, such as Indians, Pakistanis, Bangladeshis, Sri Lankans and Kashmiris. Furthermore, although Chinese have a long history of settling in the United Kingdom, the 1991 census was the first to introduce a question on ethnicity; earlier censuses only recorded country of birth. In the 2011 census, the question for ethnic group allowed for the option of "Chinese" for England, Wales, and Northern Ireland, and "Chinese, Chinese Scottish or Chinese British" for Scotland.

The terms "British-born Chinese" (BBC) and "Scottish-born Chinese" (SBC) have become common ways of describing ethnic Chinese who were born in the United Kingdom. However, the newer term of "British Chinese" began to emerge in the 1990s as a way to articulate a bicultural identity. Diana Yeh argues that the term is also a means to negotiate and offer agency to individuals often rejected as not being "British" or "Chinese" enough, yet also not being as visible as "Black" or "Asian" ethnic minorities. Along with the term "British Chinese," there has been an increasing use of more inclusive umbrella terms such as "British East Asian" (BEA) and "British East and Southeast Asian" (BESEA), especially in the arts sector and in the face of racism during the COVID-19 pandemic.

History

Britain has been receiving ethnic Chinese migrants more or less uninterruptedly on varying scales since the 19th century. While new immigrant arrivals numerically have replenished the Chinese community, they have also added to its complexity and the already existing differences within the community. Meanwhile, new generations of British-born Chinese have emerged.

First Chinese
The first recorded Chinese person in Britain was Shen Fu Tsong (1691), a Jesuit scholar who was present in the court of King James II in the 17th century. Shen was the first person to catalogue the Chinese books in the Bodleian Library. The King was so taken with him he had his portrait painted by Sir Godfrey Kneller and hung it in his bed chamber. The portrait of Shen is in the Royal Collection; it currently hangs in Windsor Castle.

William Macao (1831) was the earliest recorded Chinese person to settle in Britain. He lived in Edinburgh, Scotland from 1779. Macao married a British woman and had children, and was the first Chinese person to be baptised into the Church of Scotland. He worked for The Board of Excise at Dundas House, St Andrew Square, Edinburgh for 40 years, beginning as a servant to the clerks and retiring as Senior Accountant. He was involved in a significant naturalisation law case and for two years, until the first decision was overturned on appeal, was legally deemed a naturalised Scotsman.

A Chinese man known as John Anthony (1805) was brought to London in 1799 by the East India Company to provide accommodation for the Lascar and Chinese sailors in Angel Gardens, Shadwell in London's East End. Antony had left China around 11 years of age in the 1770s making several journeys between London and China. He was baptised into the Church of England, about six years before his death, and anglicised his name, settled in London, and married Ester Gole in 1799. Wishing to buy property, but unable to do so while an alien, in 1805 he used part of the fortune he had amassed from his London work to pay for an Act of Parliament to naturalise him as a British subject; thus being the first Chinese person to gain British citizenship. However, he died a few months after the Act was passed.

1800s to World War II

Chinese migration to Britain has a history of at least a century and a half. From the 1800s until 1945, it is estimated 20,000 had emigrated to Britain. The British East India Company, which controlled the importation of popular Chinese commodities such as tea, ceramics and silks, began employing Chinese seamen in the middle of the 19th century. Those who crewed ships to Britain had to spend time in the docks of British ports while waiting for a ship to return to China, establishing the earliest Chinatowns in Liverpool and London.

In 1901 there were 387 Chinese people living in Britain, and which grew to 1,219 in 1911. These communities consisted of a transnational and highly mobile population of Cantonese seamen and small numbers of more permanent residents who ran shops, restaurants, and boarding houses that catered for them.

During this time period, mixed marriages between Chinese men and white women were increasingly commonplace in Britain. Such relationships often attracted racist attention. In nineteenth century portside communities, for example, the wives of Chinese men were often given nicknames such as "Canton Kitty" and "Chinese Emma" to ridicule their interracial relationships. Racist attitudes continued into the twentieth century as Chinese men were increasingly vilified and associated with the "Yellow Peril," a racist stereotype that depicts people from East and Southeast Asia as an existential threat to the West.

Yellow Peril imagery was used to shame mixed marriages, portraying Chinese men as a danger to white women and "the purity of the Anglo-Saxon blood".

In World War II as more men were required to crew British merchant ships, the Chinese Merchant Seamen's Pool of approximately 20,000 was established with its headquarters in Liverpool. However, at the end of the war few Chinese who had worked as merchant seamen were allowed to remain in Britain. The British Government and the shipping companies colluded to forcibly repatriate thousands of Chinese seamen, leaving behind British wives and mixed-race children.

More than 50 years later in 2006, a memorial plaque in remembrance for those Chinese seamen was erected on Liverpool's Pier Head.

Post-World War II 
In the 1950s, they were replaced by a rapidly growing population of Chinese from the rural areas in Hong Kong's New Territories. Opening restaurants across Britain, they established firm migration chains and soon dominated the Chinese presence in Britain. In the 1960s and 1970s, they were joined by increasing numbers of Chinese students and economic migrants from Malaysia and Singapore.

Chinese migration to Britain continued to be dominated by these groups until the 1980s, when rising living standards and urbanization in Hong Kong, Singapore and Malaysia gradually reduced the volume of migration from the former British Colonies. At the same time in the 1980s, the number of students and skilled emigrants from the People's Republic of China began to rise. Since the early 1990s, the UK has also witnessed a rising inflow of economic migrants from areas in China without any previous migratory link to the UK, or even elsewhere in Europe. A relatively small number of Chinese enter Britain legally as skilled migrants. However, most migrants arrive to work in unskilled jobs, originally exclusively in the Chinese ethnic sector (catering, Chinese stores, and wholesale firms), but increasingly also in employment outside this sector (for instance, in agriculture and construction). Migrants who enter Britain for unskilled employment are from both rural and urban backgrounds. Originally, Fujianese migrants were the dominant flow, but more recently increasing numbers of migrants from the Northeast of China have arrived in the UK as well. Migrants now tend to come from an increasing number of regions of origin in China. Some Chinese unskilled migrants enter illegally to work in the black economy, in dangerous jobs with no employment rights, as the Morecambe Bay tragedy of February 2004 showed. Some claim asylum in-country, avoiding deportation after exhausting their appeals.

Demographics

According to the United Kingdom Census 2011, the British Chinese population totals to 393,141 in England and Wales (0.7% of total population), 33,706 in Scotland (0.64% of total population), and 6,303 in Northern Ireland (0.35% of total population).

Compared with most ethnic minorities in the UK, the British Chinese tend to be more geographically dispersed. However, significant numbers of British Chinese can be found in Greater London (124,250), spread across a number of its boroughs, with the next four cities with the largest British Chinese populations being Manchester (13,539), Birmingham (12,712), Glasgow (10,689), and Edinburgh (8,076). In Wales, the city with the most British Chinese was Cardiff (4,168) and, in Northern Ireland, it was Belfast (2,378). In England and Wales, 23.7% British Chinese were born in the UK, whereas over half (55.3%) were born in East Asia and 13.4% were born in Southeast Asia.

Language
Yue Chinese, which includes Cantonese and the Siyi languages, is spoken by 300,000 Britons as a primary language, whilst 12,000 Britons speak Mandarin Chinese and 10,000 speak Hakka Chinese. The proportion of British Chinese people who speak English as a first or second language is unknown.

Religion

According to the 2011 census data, most British Chinese do not record any religious affiliation. However, studies of Chinese in other contexts indicate that the lack of religious affiliation may point towards a different understanding of religion, as many still often engage in religious practices associated with Chinese folk religion.

The largest religious affiliation is to various forms of Christianity. While the 2011 census in England and Wales has a single category of "Christian," this is broken down more for Scotland (25% Roman Catholic, 26% Church of Scotland, and 49% other Protestant) and Northern Ireland (32% Catholic, 18% Presbyterian Church in Ireland, 10% Church of Ireland, 3% Methodist, and 35% other Protestant). The number of Protestants includes the rise of independent British Chinese churches.

The next largest religious affiliations are Buddhism and Islam, though data on Buddhism and Islam does not exist for Northern Ireland.

Community

Historically, British Chinatowns originated as enclaves of Chinese communities and can be found in many major cities, such as London, Birmingham, Manchester, Liverpool, Newcastle, Sheffield and Aberdeen. Today, Chinatowns have relatively few Chinese people living there, and they have become tourist attractions where Chinese restaurants and businesses predominate.

There exist several organisations in the UK that support the Chinese community. The Chinese community is a non-profit organisation that runs social events for the Chinese community. Dimsum is a media organisation which also aims to raise awareness of the cultural issues that the Chinese community face. The Chinese Information and Advice Centre supports disadvantaged people of Chinese ethnic origin in the UK.

Since 2000, the emergence of Internet discussion sites produced by British Chinese young people has provided an important forum for many of them to grapple with questions concerning their identities, experiences, and status in Britain. Within these online fora and in larger community efforts, the groups may self identify as 'British-born Chinese' or 'BBCs'.

London

The Chinese population is extremely dispersed, according to Rob Lewis, a senior demographer at the Greater London Authority: "The reason for their thin spread all over London, is because of the idea that you want to set up a Chinese restaurant that's a little way away from the next one." According to the 2011 census, Greater London included 124,250 British Chinese, making up 1.5% of the overall population.

There are Chinese community centres in Chinatown, Kensington and Chelsea, Southwark, Westminster, Camden, Greenwich, Lewisham and Tower Hamlets. Major organisations include the London Chinese Community Centre, London Chinatown Chinese Association, and the London Chinese Cultural Centre.

The Westminster Chinese Library, based at the Charing Cross Library, holds one of the largest collections of Chinese materials in UK public libraries. It has a collection of over 50,000 Chinese books available for loan and reference to local readers of Chinese; music cassettes, CDs, and video films for loan; community information and general enquiries; a national subscription service of Chinese books; and Chinese events organised from time to time. The library also hosted a photography exhibition in 2013 as part of the British Chinese Heritage project, with photographs and stories of Chinese workers.

Based in Denver House, Bounds Green the Ming-Ai (London) Institute has undertaken a number of heritage and community projects to record and archive the contributions made by British Chinese people to the local communities in the United Kingdom.

Chinese New Year celebrations in London have been celebrated since the 1960s and are famous for colourful parades, fireworks, and street dancing. Other activities include a family show in Trafalgar Square with dragon and lion dances and traditional and contemporary Chinese arts by performers from both London and China. There are fireworks displays in Leicester Square, as well as cultural stalls, food, decorations, and lion dance displays throughout the day in London Chinatown. Due to the COVID-19 pandemic, London's Chinese New Year celebrations in 2021 were shifted online.

The London Dragon Boat Festival is held annually in June at the London Regatta Centre, Royal Albert Docks. It is organised by the London Chinatown Lions Club.

Also held annually in London is the widely acclaimed, British Chinese Food Awards that promotes entrepreneurship, talent and Chinese food across the UK.

Racism

Michael Wilkes from the British Chinese Project said that racism against them is not taken as seriously as racism against African, African-Caribbean or South Asian people, and that a lot of racist attacks towards the Chinese community go unreported, primarily because of widespread mistrust in the police.

Chinese labourers

From the middle of the 19th century, Chinese were seen as a source for cheap labourers for the building of the British Empire. However, this resulted in animosity against Chinese labourers as competing for British jobs. Hostilities were seen when Chinese were being recruited for work in the British Transvaal Colony (present day South Africa), resulted in 28 riots between July 1904 to July 1905, and later becoming a key debating point as part of the 1906 United Kingdom general election. This would also be the source of the 1911 seamen's strike in Cardiff, which resulted in rioting and the destruction of about 30 Chinese laundries.

While Chinese were recruited to support British war efforts, after the end of the Second World War, the British Government sought to forcibly repatriate thousands of seamen in a Home Office policy HO 213/926 to "Compulsory repatriation of undesirable Chinese seamen." Many of the seamen left behind wives and mixed-race children that they would never see again. A network has also been established for families of Chinese seamen who were repatriated after the Second World War.

2001 Foot-and-mouth outbreak
Government reports in early 2001 highlighted the smuggling of illegal meat as a possible source for the 2001 United Kingdom foot-and-mouth outbreak, some of which was destined for a Chinese restaurant. This reportedly resulted in a drop in 40% of trade for Chinese catering businesses throughout some 12,000 Chinese takeaways and 3,000 Chinese restaurants in the United Kingdom, which made up about 80% of the British Chinese workforce at the time. Community leaders saw this as racist and xenophobic, with a scapegoating of the British Chinese community for the spread of the disease.

COVID-19 pandemic

On 12 February 2020, Sky News reported that some British Chinese said they were facing increasing levels of racist abuse during the COVID-19 pandemic. It was recorded that hate crimes against British Chinese people between January and March 2020 tripled the amount of hate crimes in the previous two years in the UK. According to the London Metropolitan Police, between January and June 2020, 457 race-related crimes were committed against British East and Southeast Asians.

Verbal abuse has been one of the common forms of racism experienced by British Chinese. Just before the lockdown in February 2020, British Chinese children recalled experiences of fear and frustration due to bullying and name calling in their schools. According to a June 2020 poll, 76% of British Chinese had received racial slurs at least once, and 50% regularly received racial slurs, a significantly higher frequency than experienced by any other racial minority.

Racism during the pandemic has also impacted a number of Chinese-owned business, especially within the catering business, as well as an increase in violent assaults against British East and Southeast Asians.

British Chinese have sought ways to support one another, especially in response to racism coming out of the pandemic. A grassroots group known as Britain's East and Southeast Asian Network was formed to promote positive representation of the community in the UK. Religious groups have also offered a source of solidarity, such as through British Chinese churches and mainstream churches like the Church of England, the latter through the group The Teahouse.

Socioeconomics
Since the relatively elevated immigration of the 1960s, the Chinese community has made rapid socioeconomic advancements in the UK over the course of a generation. There still exists a segregation of the Chinese in the labour market, however, with a large proportion of the Chinese employed in the Chinese catering industry. Overall, as a demographic group, the British Chinese are well-educated and earn higher incomes when compared to other demographic groups in the UK. The British Chinese also fare well on many socioeconomic indicators, including low incarceration rates and high rates of health.

Education
The British Chinese community place an exceptionally high value on post-secondary educational attainment; emphasize effort over innate ability; give their children supplementary tutoring irrespective of financial barriers; and restrict their children's exposure to counter-productive influences that might hinder educational attainment via the Confucian paradigm and the sole belief of greater social mobility. The proportion of British Chinese achieving 5 or more good GCSEs stood at a relatively high 70%. According to the 2001 census, 30% of the British Chinese post-16 population are full-time students compared to a UK average of 8%. When it comes to the distinguished category of being recognized as the "paragon immigrants", British Chinese are also more likely to take math and science-intensive courses such as physics and calculus. A study done by the Royal Society of Chemistry and Institute of Physics revealed that British Chinese students were four times more likely than White or Black students in the United Kingdom to achieve three or more science A-levels. In spite of language barriers, among recent Chinese immigrants to the UK (who do not have English as a first language) 86% of pre-teens reached the required standard of English on the national curriculum exam. The overall result of 86% was one percentage point above the British Indians and remained the highest rate among all ethnic groups in the United Kingdom.

The British Chinese community has been hailed as a socioeconomic "success story" by British sociologists, who have for years glossed over socioeconomic difficulties and inequalities among the major ethnic groups in Britain. The degree educational advantages varies widely however: minorities of European descent fare best, together with the British Chinese. The group has more well-educated members, with a much higher proportion of university graduates than British-born whites. These latter have not been negligible: research has shown that the Chinese as a group face both discrimination and problems accessing public and social services. Many have activated ill-conceived stereotypes of the Chinese as a collectivist, conformist, entrepreneurial, ethnic group, and conforming to Confucian values, which is a divergence of British-Chinese culture and construction of ethnic identity. Educational attainment is greatly espoused by parental reasoning as the British Chinese community cites higher education as a route to ensure a higher ranking job.

According to a study done by the London School of Economics in 2010, the British Chinese tend to be better educated and earn more than the general British population as a whole. British Chinese are also more likely to go to more prestigious universities or to get higher class degrees than any other ethnic minority in the United Kingdom. Nearly 45% of British Chinese men and more than a third of British Chinese women achieved a first or higher degree. Between 1995 and 1997, 29% of British Chinese have higher educational qualifications. This was the highest rate for any ethnic group during those two years. Between 2006 and 2008, the figure had risen to 45%, where it again remained the highest for any ethnic group. In terms of educational achievement at the secondary level, Chinese males and females perform well above the national median. A tenth of Chinese boys are ranked in the top 3% overall, and a tenth of Chinese girls in the top 1%. Due to the rigorous primary and secondary school system in East Asian countries such as China, Hong Kong, and Taiwan, Britons of Chinese, Hong Kong, and Taiwanese descent rank within the top 5 in British as well as international scholastic mathematical and scientific aptitude tests and tend to score better in these subjects than the general population average. British Chinese remain rare among most Special Educational Needs types at the primary and secondary school level, except for Speech, Language and Communication needs, where first-generation Chinese pupils are greatly over-represented with the influx of first-generation immigrants coming from Mainland China, Taiwan, and Hong Kong.

Employment
First generation British citizens of Chinese backgrounds remain over-represented in self-employment, however, rates of self-employment fell between 1991 and 2001 as second generation British Chinese chose not to follow their parents into business and instead choose to find employment in the paid labor market. First and second-generation British Chinese men have one of the lowest unemployment rates in the nation, with an unemployment rate of 4.08% and 4.32% compared with slightly higher figures of 5% for White Irish (first and second generation). Vertical segregation is also apparent for men and women in the British Chinese community. British Chinese men are twice as likely to be working than White British men to be in professional jobs (27%, and 14% respectively). Chinese men have the third highest rate of employment in managerial jobs at 31%. This compares to 45% for Indian men, 35% for white men and 23% for Black Caribbeans.

A colossal rate of diversity in British self-employment and entrepreneurship in the British Chinese Community has been considerably high. East Asian British groups (Chinese, Japanese, South Korean) and British South Asian groups (Indian, Bangladeshi, and Pakistani) typically have higher rates of self-employment than Whites, while Black groups (Black African and Black Caribbean) have lower rates. Self-employment rates in the British Chinese community is generally higher than the national average. For instance, White British had self-employment rates of 17% in 2001, but the British Chinese self-employment rate was 28%, the higher than the British Indian rate of 21%, British Pakistanis of 27%, and the highest overall among Britain's main ethnic groups. However, overall aggregate self-employment fell between the decade of 1991 to 2001 as the proportion of British Chinese with higher qualifications grew from 27% to 43% between the years of 1991 to 2006. 75% of male British Chinese entrepreneurs worked in the distribution, hotel, and catering industries. In 1991, 34.1% of British Chinese men and 20.3% of British Chinese women were self-employed and the rate was the highest among all Britain's major ethnic groups during that year. In 2001, self-employment rates for British Chinese men dropped to 27.8% and 18.3% for British Chinese women, yet overall rates still remained the highest among all of Britain's major ethnic groups. The overall self-employment rate in 2001 was 23%. Common business industries for the British Chinese include restaurants, business services, medical and vet services, recreational and cultural services, wholesale distribution, catering, hotel management, retail, and construction. By 2004, overall British Chinese self-employment was just under 16%, as one in five (21%) of British Pakistanis were self-employed and more British Chinese choose to acquire higher qualifications via education. By 2006, 29% of all
Chinese men were classed as self-employed compared to 17% of white British men and 18% of Chinese women compared to 7% of White British women.

Economics
British Chinese men and women also rank very highly in terms of receiving wages well above the national median but are less likely to receive a higher net weekly income than any other ethnic group. According to a 2009 report by the National Equality Panel, British Chinese men earn the highest median wage for any ethnic group with £12.70 earned per hour, followed by the medians for White British men at £11.40, and Multiracial Britons at £11.30 and British Indian men at £11.20. British Chinese women also earn a high median wage, third only to Black Caribbean women and Multiracial Briton women with a median wage of £10.21 earned per hour. However British Chinese women are also more likely to experience more pay penalties than other ethnic group in the United Kingdom despite possessing higher qualifications. Women of all ethnic groups have lower mean individual incomes than men in the same ethnic group in the UK. Pakistani and Bangladeshi women have the highest gender income gap while British Chinese have one of the lowest income gender gaps. British Chinese women also have the individual incomes among all ethnic groups in the UK followed by White British and Indian women. Difference in men's incomes and number of children across ethnic groups. British Chinese women have the highest average equivalent incomes among various ethnic groups in the UK. Though British Chinese women have both high individual and equivalent incomes, but they also have very dispersed incomes. In 2001, Overall economic activity in the British Chinese community tends to be lower than the general population average. In 2019, the British Chinese had a median hourly pay of £15.38, second only to the White Irish group.

A study by the Joseph Rowntree Foundation in 2011 found out that British Chinese have one of the lowest poverty rates among different ethnic groups in Britain. The British Chinese adult poverty rate was 20% and the child poverty rate stood at 30%. Of the different ethnic groups studied, Bangladeshis, Pakistanis, and Black Africans had the highest rates of child and adult poverty overall. In contrast, British Chinese, Black Caribbeans, British Indians and White British had the lowest rates.

Health and welfare
Chinese men and women were the least likely to report their health as "not good" of all ethnic groups. Chinese men and women had the lowest rates of long-term illness or disability which restricts daily activities. The British Chinese population (5.8%) were least likely to be providing informal care (unpaid care to relatives, friends or neighbours). Around 0.25% of the British Chinese population were residents in hospital and other care establishments.

Chinese men (17%) were the least likely to smoke of all ethnic groups. Fewer than 10% of Chinese women smoked. Fewer than 10% of the Chinese adult population drank above the recommended daily alcohol guidelines on their heaviest drinking day.

The Chinese National Healthy Living Centre was founded in 1987 to promote healthy living, and provide access to health services, for the Chinese community in the UK. The community is widely dispersed across the country and currently makes the lowest use of health services of all minority ethnic groups. The Centre aims to reduce the health inequality between the Chinese community and the general population. Language difficulties and long working hours in the catering trade present major obstacles to many Chinese people in accessing mainstream health provision. Language and cultural barriers can result in their being given inappropriate health solutions. Isolation is a common problem amongst this widely dispersed community and can lead to a range of mental illnesses. The centre, based close to London's Chinatown, provides a range of services designed to tackle both the physical and psychological aspects of health.

Voter registration
A survey conducted in 2006, estimated that around 30% of British Chinese were not on the electoral register, and therefore not able to vote. This compares to 6% of whites and 17% for all ethnic minorities.

In a bid to increase voter registration and turnout, and reverse voter apathy within the community, campaigns have been organized such as the British Chinese Register to Vote organised by Get Active UK, a working title that encompasses all the activities run by the Integration of British Chinese into Politics (the British Chinese Project) and its various partners. The campaign wishes to highlight the low awareness of politics among the British Chinese community; to encourage those eligible to vote but not on the electoral register to get registered; and to help people make a difference on issues affecting themselves and their communities on a daily basis by getting their voices heard through voting.

The largest political organisation in the British Chinese community is the Conservative Friends of the Chinese.

Arts
The esea contemporary (formerly Centre for Chinese Contemporary Art or CFCCA) is the international agency for the development and promotion of contemporary Chinese artists. Established in 1986, it is based in Manchester, the city with the second largest Chinese community in the UK, and the organisation is part of the region's rich Chinese heritage. The Centre for Chinese Contemporary Art also hosts the International Chinese Live Art Festival which showcases work by Chinese artists from across the world.

The Yellow Earth Theatre company is a London-based international touring company formed by five British East Asian performers in 1995. It aims to promote the writing and performing talents of East Asians in Britain.

The China Arts Space is an organisation that promotes East Asian visual and performing arts. British lecturers Dr Felicia Chan and Dr Andy Willis, of the University of Manchester and University of Salford respectively, have proposed that artists of Chinese heritage in the UK were accepted inclusively under the label British Asian in the 1980s.

Music
KT Tunstall is a well-known Scottish singer-songwriter and guitarist whose maternal grandmother was Chinese.

Film and television
British Chinese film and television productions include:
 The Chinese Detective, (1981–1982) television series
 Ping Pong (1986) directed by Po-Chih Leong
 Soursweet (1988) directed by Mike Newell
 Peggy Su! (1997) directed by Frances-Anne Solomon
 Dim Sum (A Little Bit of Heart) (2002) directed by Jane Wong
 The Missing Chink (2004) directed by Kate Solomon
 Sweet & Sour Comedy (2004) directed by Neil A. McLennan
 Spirit Warriors (2010) television series created by Jo Ho starring Jessica Henwick, Benedict Wong, Tom Wu and Burt Kwouk

Documentary
 Silk Screens (2008)
 Chinatown (2006), directed by Charlotte Metcalf and Dollan Cannel

Radio
 Chinese in Britain (BBC Radio 4; April/May 2007, May 2008), presented by Anna Chen
 Beyond the Takeaway (BBC Radio 4; March 2003), directed by David K.S. Tse
 Liver Birds and Laundrymen. Europe's Earliest Chinatown (BBC Radio 3; March 2005), presented by Gregory B. Lee
 Eastern Horizon, (BBC Manchester; December 1983)

Books and publishing
Huang Yongjun, the founder and General Manager of New Classic Press (UK) has acted as a major advocator of the "China Dream" in the United Kingdom. The New Classic Press that he founded is an effort to "explain China to the world".

Notable individuals

See also

 British East and Southeast Asian
 London Fo Guang Shan Temple
 Shaolin Temple UK
 British-Chinese relations

References

Notes

Bibliography

Further reading
There have been very few books written on the history of the Chinese in Britain. Another work, overviews the lives of Chinese who travelled to Britain over 300 years from the first in 1687. Most other works which exists are mainly surveys, dissertations, census figures, and newspaper reports.

Books

 Chan, Graham (1997). Dim Sum: Little Pieces of Heart, British Chinese Short Stories. Crocus Books.
 Lee, Gregory B. (2002) Chinas unlimited: Making the imaginaries of China and Chineseness. London.
 Ng, Kwee Choo (1968) The Chinese in London. London.
 Pai, Hsiao-Hung (2008) Chinese Whispers: The True Story Behind Britain's Hidden Army of Labour. Penguin.
 Shang, Anthony (1984) The Chinese in Britain, London: Batsford.
 Summerskill, Michael (1982) China on the Western Front. Britain's Chinese work force in the First World War. London.
 Watson, James L. (1976). Emigration and the Chinese Lineage: The Mans in Hong Kong and London. Berkeley: University of California Press.

Chapters and Articles

 Akilli, Sinan, M.A. "Chinese Immigration to Britain in the Post-WWII Period", Hacettepe University, Turkey. Postimperial and Postcolonial Literature in English, 15 May 2003
 Archer, L. and Francis, B. (December 2005) "Constructions of racism by British Chinese pupils and parents", Race, Ethnicity and Education, Volume 8, Number 4, pp. 387–407(21).
 Archer, L. and Francis, B. (August 2005) "Negotiating the dichotomy of Boffin and Triad: British-Chinese pupils' constructions of 'laddism'", The Sociological Review, Volume 53, Issue 3, Page 495.
 Baker, Hugh D.R. "Nor good red herring: the Chinese in Britain". In: Shaw, Yu-ming, ed. China and Europe in the twentieth century. Taipei: Institute of International Relations, National Chengchi University, 1986. 318p. 1986 306–315
 Chan, Graham . "The Chinese in Britain". Adapted from an article originally published in Brushstrokes, issue 12, June 1999. For additional articles and stories go to Graham Chan's website
 Liu, William H. "Chinese children in Great Britain, their needs and problems". Chinese Culture (Taipei) 16, no.4 (December 1975 133–136)
 Ng, Alex. "The library needs of the Chinese community in the United Kingdom." London: British Library Research and Development Dept. 1989 102p (British Library research paper, 56.)
 Parker, David. "Rethinking British Chinese identities". In: Skelton, Tracey; Valentine, Gill, eds. Cool places: geographies of youth cultures. London; New York: Routledge, 1998. 66–82
 Parker, D. "Britain". In L. Pan Ed. (2006) Encyclopaedia of the Chinese Overseas, Singapore: Chinese Heritage Centre (revised edition).
 Parker, David and Song, Miri (2006). "Ethnicity, Social Capital and the Internet: British Chinese websites". Ethnicities 6, no. 2, 178–202.
 Seed, John. ‘"Limehouse Blues": Looking for Chinatown in the London Docks,1900–1940’, History Workshop Journal, No. 62 (Autumn 2006), pp. 58–85. The Chinese In Limehouse 1900 – 1940.
 Tam, Suk-Tak. "Representations of 'the Chinese' and 'ethnicity' in British racial discourse". In: Sinn, Elizabeth, ed. The last half century of Chinese overseas. Aberdeen, Hong Kong: Hong Kong University Press, 1998. 81–90.
 Watson, James L. 1977a. "Chinese Emigrant Ties to the Home Community". New Community 5, 343–352.
 Watson, James L. 1977b. "The Chinese: Hong Kong Villagers in the British Catering Trade". In Between Two Cultures: Migrants and Minorities in Britain (ed.) J.L. Watson. Oxford: Basil Blackwell.
 Yeh, Diana. ‘Ethnicities on the Move: ‘British-Chinese’ art – identity, subjectivity, politics and beyond’, Critical Quarterly, Summer 2000, vol. 4, no. 2, pp. 65–91.

External links
 Chinese diaspora: Britain (BBC News)
 Chinese Communities – Old Bailey Proceedings Online, 1674 to 1913
 Time Outs China in London – celebrating Chinese history, communities, cuisine, and lifestyle in London

B
 
British